Latimer is a census-designated place (CDP) in Jackson County, Mississippi, United States. It is part of the Pascagoula Metropolitan Statistical Area. The population was 6,079 at the 2010 census, up from 4,288 at the 2000 census.

Geography
Latimer is in western Jackson County, bordered to the west by D'Iberville in Harrison County and to the south by St. Martin. Interstate 10 forms the southern boundary of the community, with access from Exit 50. The northern, less-populated half of the Latimer CDP lies within De Soto National Forest.

Demographics

2020 census

As of the 2020 United States census, there were 6,720 people, 2,561 households, and 1,798 families residing in the CDP.

2000 census
As of the census of 2000, there were 4,288 people, 1,468 households, and 1,174 families residing in the CDP. The population density was 264.5 people per square mile (102.1/km2). There were 1,538 housing units at an average density of 94.9/sq mi (36.6/km2). The racial makeup of the CDP was 94.47% White, 2.12% African American, 0.61% Native American, 1.52% Asian, 0.05% Pacific Islander, 0.30% from other races, and 0.93% from two or more races. Hispanic or Latino of any race were 1.19% of the population.

There were 1,468 households, out of which 41.8% had children under the age of 18 living with them, 65.2% were married couples living together, 9.7% had a female householder with no husband present, and 20.0% were non-families. 15.7% of all households were made up of individuals, and 4.6% had someone living alone who was 65 years of age or older. The average household size was 2.92 and the average family size was 3.23.

In the CDP, the population was spread out, with 28.9% under the age of 18, 8.8% from 18 to 24, 33.5% from 25 to 44, 21.2% from 45 to 64, and 7.6% who were 65 years of age or older. The median age was 33 years. For every 100 females, there were 103.3 males. For every 100 females age 18 and over, there were 100.9 males.

The median income for a household in the CDP was $43,146, and the median income for a family was $47,215. Males had a median income of $29,492 versus $22,164 for females. The per capita income for the CDP was $17,551. About 5.6% of families and 8.1% of the population were below the poverty line, including 13.4% of those under age 18 and 14.0% of those age 65 or over.

Education
Latimer is served by the Jackson County School District. It includes three elementary schools, one middle school, and one high school. Students in Latimer attend schools in St. Martin.

Elementary schools
 St. Martin North Elementary
 St. Martin East Elementary
 St. Martin Upper Elementary

Middle school
 St. Martin Middle School

High school
 St. Martin High School

References

Census-designated places in Jackson County, Mississippi
Census-designated places in Mississippi
Pascagoula metropolitan area